Victoria Airport Water Aerodrome  is a seaplane base located  north northwest of Victoria, British Columbia, Canada, adjacent to Victoria International Airport.

The airport is classified as an airport of entry by Nav Canada and is staffed by the Canada Border Services Agency (CBSA). CBSA officers at this airport can handle general aviation aircraft only, with no more than 15 passengers.

Today, Pat Bay serves as an alternate airport for Harbour Air flights to Victoria Inner Harbour. Charters in and out of Pat Bay are rare, but not out of the question.

See also
 List of airports in Greater Victoria
 Floatplane

References

Seaplane bases in British Columbia
Saanich Peninsula
Transport in the Capital Regional District
Registered aerodromes in British Columbia